Thomas, Tom or Tommy Robertson may refer to:
Thomas Robertson (priest) (fl. 1532–1559), Anglican Archdeacon of Leicester and Dean of Durham
Thomas Alexander Robertson (1909–1973), better known by his pen name of "Vagaland", Shetland poet
Thomas Bolling Robertson (born 1950), American diplomat, ambassador to Slovenia 2004–2008
Thomas Campbell Robertson (1789–1863), British civil servant in India
Thomas Chalmers Robertson (1907–1989), author, ecologist and conservationist from South Africa
Thomas William Robertson (1829–1871), English dramatist and stage director
Hamza Robertson (Tom Robertson, born 1982), English singer
T. A. Robertson (Thomas Argyll Robertson, 1909–1994), Scottish MI5 intelligence officer
Thomas Dolby (Thomas Morgan Robertson, born 1958), musician
Thomas Robertson (minister) (died 1799), co-founder of the Royal Society of Edinburgh
Thomas S. Robertson, Scottish-born American professor of marketing
Thomas Graham Robertson, Lord Robertson (1881–1944), Scottish advocate

Politicians
Thomas A. Robertson (1848–1892), U.S. Representative from Kentucky
Thomas B. Robertson (1779–1828), U.S. Representative, governor and federal judge from Louisiana
Thomas Herbert Robertson (1849–1916), British politician, Conservative MP for Hackney South
Thomas J. Robertson (1823–1897), U.S. Senator from South Carolina
Thomas Robertson (Australian politician) (1830–1891), New South Wales politician
Thomas Robertson (Nova Scotia politician) (1852–1902), Canadian politician, Member of Parliament from Nova Scotia 
Thomas Robertson (Ontario politician) (1827–1905), Canadian politician, Member of Parliament from Ontario
Thomas Atholl Robertson (1874–1955), Scottish politician, Liberal MP for Finchley 1923–24

Sportspeople
Thomas Robertson (footballer, born 1864) (1864–1924), Scottish footballer (Queen's Park FC and Scotland) and referee
 Thomas Robertson (footballer, born 1875) (1875–1923), Scottish footballer who played for Stoke, Liverpool and Southampton
 Tommy Robertson (1876–1941), Scottish international footballer
 Tom Robertson (Australian footballer) (1876–1942), Australian rules footballer
 Tom Robertson (rugby union) (born 1994), Australian rugby union football player
 Tom Robertson (Scottish footballer) (1908-1962), Scottish footballer (Ayr United, Dundee, Clyde)
 Tom Robertson (American football), American football center

See also
 Robertson (surname)